Matthew Goodson (born 3 March 1970) is a New Zealand cricketer. He played seventeen first-class matches for Central Districts and Wellington between 1989 and 1995.

See also
 List of Wellington representative cricketers

References

External links
 

1970 births
Living people
New Zealand cricketers
Central Districts cricketers
Wellington cricketers
Cricketers from Palmerston North